Clayton is a town in and the county seat of Barbour County, Alabama, United States. The population was 3,008 at the 2010 census, up from 1,475 in 2000.

History
Clayton has been the county seat since 1834, two years after the creation of Barbour County. Clayton is located geographically in the center of the county. The town was located at the headwaters of the Pea and Choctawhatchee rivers on the historic road from Hobdy's Bridge over the Pea River to Eufaula on the Chattahoochee River. By 1818, there were a few settlers in the area around Clayton, but settlement began in earnest around 1823. The town was named for Augustine S. Clayton, a Georgia jurist and congressman. Clayton became the county seat of Barbour County in 1833 and was laid out on a central courthouse square plan. The first Circuit Court was held in Clayton on September 23, 1833. The Clayton post office was established in September 1835 with John F. Keener as postmaster. Clayton, with a population of 200, was incorporated on December 21, 1841, by the Alabama Legislature. Its first mayor, after incorporation, was John Jackson.

Clayton has a rich heritage with four properties listed on the National Register of Historic Places. It is also known for its Whiskey Bottle Tombstone, which was featured in Ripley's Believe It or Not!.

Governor George Wallace was born in nearby Clio and began his legal and political career in Clayton. In March 1956, Wallace attended at the Clayton football stadium the first public meeting of the Barbour County White Citizens' Council, with an estimated 4,500 persons attending the white supremacist rally, "the largest rally in the history of the county seat."

Geography
Clayton is located at 31°52'39.014" North, 85°26'56.486" West (31.877504, -85.449024).

Climate
The climate in this area is characterized by hot, humid summers and generally mild to cool winters.  According to the Köppen Climate Classification system, Clayton has a humid subtropical climate, abbreviated "Cfa" on climate maps.

Demographics

2020 census

As of the 2020 United States census, there were 2,265 people, 569 households, and 359 families residing in the town.

2010 census
As of the census of 2010, there were 3,008 people, 552 households, and 349 families residing in the town. The racial makeup of the town was 63.8% Black or African American, 35.8% White,  0.0% Native American, 0.0% from other races, and 0.3% from two or more races. .6% of the population were Hispanic or Latino of any race.

There were 552 households, out of which 28.8% had children under the age of 18 living with them, 31.2% were married couples living together, 27.7% had a female householder with no husband present, and 36.8% were non-families. 33.5% of all households were made up of individuals, and 13.1% had someone living alone who was 65 years of age or older. The average household size was 2.33 and the average family size was 2.95.

In the town, the population was spread out, with 11.9% under the age of 18, 11.7% from 18 to 24, 46.1% from 25 to 44, 23.3% from 45 to 64, and 7.1% who were 65 years of age or older. The median age was 34.8 years. For every 100 females, there were 317.2 males. For every 100 females age 18 and over, there were 112.5 males.

The median income for a household in the town was $23,629, and the median income for a family was $17,778. Males had a median income of $33,750 versus $26,964 for females. The per capita income for the town was $11,288. About 27.4% of families and 29.3% of the population were below the poverty line, including 30.6% of those under age 18 and 26.3% of those age 65 or over.

Education
Clayton is served by Barbour County Schools. Barbour County High School and Barbour County Primary School are located in the town of Clayton.

Notable people
Katherine Jackson, mother of entertainer Michael Jackson
George W. Andrews, U.S. House of Representatives
Billy Beasley, Alabama politician
Jere Beasley (born 1935), two-term Lieutenant Governor of Alabama and acting Governor of Alabama
Thomas J. Clarke, Reconsrruction era state legislator
Bertram Tracy Clayton (1862–1918), U.S. House of Representatives representing New York and U.S. Army officer killed in World War I
Henry DeLamar Clayton, Sr. (1827–1889), major general in the Confederate army; President of the University of Alabama
Henry De Lamar Clayton, Jr. (1857–1929), U.S. House of Representatives, author of the Clayton Antitrust Act
Travis Grant (born 1950), college and professional basketball player
Clarence Clement "Shovel" Hodge (1893–1967), Major League Baseball pitcher
McDowell Lee, Member of the Alabama House of Representatives
Albert J. Lingo, director of the Alabama Department of Public Safety from 1963 to 1965
Ann Lowe (1899–1981), designer of wedding dress for Jacqueline Bouvier Kennedy Onassis for her marriage to John F. Kennedy
George Wallace (1919–1998), Governor of Alabama and U.S. presidential candidate
George C. Wallace, Jr. (born 1951), Alabama State Treasurer
Lurleen Wallace (1926–1968), Governor of Alabama
Ariosto A. Wiley, U.S. Representative from 1901 to 1908

Gallery

References

External links
Barbour County Schools 

Towns in Alabama
Towns in Barbour County, Alabama
County seats in Alabama
1823 establishments in Alabama